Peltola is a Finnish surname. Notable people with the surname include:

 Juha Peltola (born 1975), Finnish orienteering competitor
 Jukka Peltola (born 1987), Finnish ice hockey player
 Markku Peltola (1956–2007), Finnish actor and musician
 Mary Sattler Peltola (born 1973), Yup'ik American politician
 Matti Peltola (born 2002), Finnish professional football player
 Niko Peltola (born 1990), Finnish professional ice hockey defenceman
 Pirjo Peltola (born 1961), Finnish sport shooter
 Timo Peltola (born 1972), Finnish judoka
 Ville-Joonas Peltola (born 1985), Finnish professional ice hockey player

Finnish-language surnames